Mimeresia moyambina, the moyambina harlequin, is a butterfly in the family Lycaenidae. It is found in Sierra Leone, Ivory Coast and Ghana. The habitat consists of forests.

References

Butterflies described in 1904
Poritiinae